The Fort Bend Independent School District, also known as Fort Bend ISD or FBISD, is a school district system in the U.S. state of Texas based in the city of Sugar Land.

The district spans  covering almost all of the city of Sugar Land, the city of Meadows Place, the Fort Bend county portion of Missouri City, Arcola, small sections of Houston, small sections of Pearland (including some of Shadow Creek Ranch, which is attempting to secede from FBISD), the unincorporated communities of Clodine, Four Corners, Juliff, and Fresno, and the Fort Bend County portion of Mission Bend.

Fort Bend Independent School District was created by the consolidation of the Sugar Land ISD and Missouri City ISD in 1959. The school district is the seventh-largest public school system in the state of Texas and third largest within the Houston–Sugar  Land–Baytown Metropolitan Area. The school district is currently the largest employer in Fort Bend County with more than 9,000 district employees, and encompasses some of the wealthiest locales in the State of Texas.

Fort Bend ISD is distinguished by its honors. In 2010, the school district was rated "recognized" by the Texas Education Agency.

The district is the only school district in the nation to be named a 2011 National School District of Character by the National Schools of Character Program in Washington DC—and only one of two districts in Texas to be honored with this designation. The Washington Post ranked Clements, Austin, Kempner, Travis, Dulles, Hightower, and Elkins High Schools as seven of the Top 2011 High Schools in the Nation.

History 

Fort Bend ISD was formed when Sugar Land ISD and Missouri City ISD merged after an election on April 18, 1959. The first superintendent was Louis P. Rodgers, who had been the Missouri City ISD superintendent upon the merger. The Sugar Land ISD superintendent Edward Mercer, became the assistant superintendent.

Missouri City ISD was formed from Missouri City Common School, House Common School, and Mustang Common School (Fresno area). Sugar Land ISD was formed in 1918 and was expanded by adding Sartartia Common School and Clodine Common School in 1948.

Originally FBISD was racially segregated, with white high school students attending the consolidated Dulles High School, with its permanent campus in Sugar Land, and black high school students attending M.R. Wood School in Sugar Land. In 1963, FBISD had 600 students. The school district desegregated in September 1965; in the post-desegregation period Dulles was the district's sole high school until Willowridge High School opened in 1979.

Rodgers died in May 1967 so Mercer became superintendent. Lawrence Elkins succeeded Mercer after the latter retired in August 1974.

In 1969 the school district had 1,000 students, and its enrollment was increasing. Between 1979 and 1997, a new high school opened at intervals no more than five years apart. The district became the fastest growing school district in the State of Texas. In August 1997 the district had over 14,000 students at its high schools, then numbering six.

A portion of Stafford was formerly a part of Fort Bend ISD, but it broke away and formed the Stafford Municipal School District. In 1977, the FBISD portions of the city of Stafford left FBISD for the Stafford MSD, and the move was found to be constitutional in 1981. Residents in Stafford's ETJ are served by Fort Bend ISD, not Stafford MSD.

In February 1984 Rodney E. LeBoeuf became superintendent. LeBouef left in March 1991 and Raj K. Chopra became superintendent in August of that year. Chopra left on July 20, 1994. The next superintendent, Don W. Hooper, assumed power on February 15, 1995.

Circa 1997 FBISD was the fastest-growing school district in Texas, with new comprehensive high schools opening in increments of fewer than five years.

Hooper's retirement was scheduled for June 2002.

In 2021, during the COVID-19 pandemic in Texas, the district administration chose not to make masks mandatory even though the Fort Bend county judge, KP George, issued a mask mandate. Governor of Texas Greg Abbott had prohibited local governments from issuing mask mandates. In August the district board voted 4–3 to reverse its stance and require masks.

Administration 
The Fort Bend ISD Police Department is headquartered in Stafford. Its current headquarters was the former FBISD Administration Building located off FM1092 which was later converted into a vehicle maintenance facility after the administration HQ was moved to Sugar Land.

FBISD's current administration building is located in Sugar Land, near the Town Square and First Colony Mall. There is also the FBISD Annex, which contains an auditorium/banquet hall for FBISD, as well as a shop for teachers of FBISD.

When the district was first created Sugar Land Junior High School had the administrative offices. However, there was no tax assessor-collector in Sugar Land, so the taxation office was in Missouri City as that municipality did have one. In the summer of 1961 the district opened the first dedicated headquarters. In October 1985 the current district headquarters opened.

District operations
In 2019 the FBISD administration stated that it was considering changing the class ranking system so that students are ranked according to the school's attendance zones in which they reside instead of the schools which they actually attend.

Athletics and extracurriculars 
FBISD is known for having some of the best athletic teams in Houston. All 11 high schools contain 2 gyms, Tennis Courts, a football/soccer/track field, a baseball field, and softball field, each fitted with LED scoreboards.

FBISD also manages 2 athletic complexes, complete with turf and Video/LED scoreboards from NEVCO:
 Kenneth Hall Stadium (Football/Soccer/Track) and Buddy Hopson Field House (Gym) located next to Hightower
 Edward Mercer Stadium (Football/Soccer) and Wheeler Field House (gym) located next to the Admin Building
 Frankie Field (Baseball) is also located next to Mercer, but it is Clements's Home Field

Louis P. Rodgers Memorial Auditorium in Dulles High School was built in 1969.

Recognitions 
Seventy percent of the district's campuses received an Exemplary or Recognized rating from the Texas Education Agency in 2002. That same year, the district was named a Recognized District by the Texas Education Agency for the second consecutive year, making it one of the largest public school districts in Texas to receive that rating. Currently the district is ranked "academically acceptable" and has been for the last several years.

Austin High School and Clements High School, both in Sugar Land, have been recognized by Texas Monthly magazine in its list of the top 10 high schools in the state of Texas. In addition, Clements, Austin, and Elkins high schools ranked 313th, 626th, and 702nd, respectively, among the top 1000 schools in the United States by Newsweek.

Fort Bend ISD has been named one of the top 100 School Districts in the Nation for a Fine Arts Education, according to a nationwide survey of public and private school programs.

Governance
The current Superintendent is Dr. Christie Whitbeck who was chosen by the Board of Trustees in 2021 and succeeded Dr. Charles Dupre after his retirement. FBISD is served by a board of trustees who are periodically elected. Each trustee represents one of the seven regions in the school district.

Schools

High schools

Middle schools 

 Billy Baines Middle School (Sienna Plantation/Missouri City) (opened 2006)
 David Crockett Middle School (Unincorporated area) (opened 2007)
 John F. Dulles Middle School (Sugar Land) (opened 1965)
 First Colony Middle School (Sugar Land) (opened 1985)
 1999–2000 National Blue Ribbon School
 Fort Settlement Middle School (Sugar Land) (opened 2001)
2007 National Blue Ribbon School
 Macario Garcia Middle School (Unincorporated area) (opened 1995)
 Hodges Bend Middle School (Unincorporated area) (opened 1987)
 James Bowie Middle School (Unincorporated area) (opened 2011)
 Lake Olympia Middle School (Missouri City) (opened 1992)
 Christa McAuliffe Middle School (Houston) (opened 1986)
 Missouri City Middle School (Missouri City) (opened 1975)
 Quail Valley Middle School (Missouri City) (opened 1978, closed 1994, reopened 1996)
 Home of the FBISD Gifted and Talented Academy (opened 2007)
 Sartartia Middle School (Sugar Land) (opened 2001)
 Sugar Land Middle School (Sugar Land) (opened 1975)
Ronald Thornton Middle School (Sienna Plantation) (opened 2017)

Elementary schools 

 Armstrong Elementary School (Missouri City) (opened 2008)
 Austin Parkway Elementary School (Sugar Land) (opened 1989)
Anne McCormick Elementary School (Riverstone) (opened 2016)
 Barrington Place Elementary School (Sugar Land) (opened 1990)
 Sonal Bhuchar Elementary School (Riverstone, Unincorporated area) - Will open in 2023
 Blue Ridge Elementary School (Houston) (opened 1969)
 Brazos Bend Elementary School (Sugar Land) (opened 1997)
 Briargate Elementary School (Houston) (opened August 1977)
 Walter Moses Burton Elementary School (Unincorporated area) (opened 1996)
 Colony Bend Elementary School (Sugar Land) (opened 1981)
 Colony Meadows Elementary School (Sugar Land) (opened 1991)
 Commonwealth Elementary School (Sugar Land) (opened 1997)
 Cornerstone Elementary School (Sugar Land) (opened 2007)
 Rita Drabek Elementary School (Unincorporated area) (opened 2001)
 Dulles Elementary School (Sugar Land) (opened 1976)
 Arizona Fleming Elementary School (Unincorporated area) (opened 1994)
 Edgar Glover Elementary School (Missouri City) (opened 1994)
 Lula Goodman Elementary School (Unincorporated area) (opened 2000)
 Goodman was one of two FBISD campuses that were the most damaged by Hurricane Harvey in 2017, but it reopened ahead of schedule.
 Highlands Elementary School (Sugar Land) (opened 1986)
 Mary Austin Holley Elementary School (Unincorporated area) (opened 2007)
 Heritage Rose Elementary School (Rosharon) (opened 2010)
 Hunters Glen Elementary School (Missouri City) (opened 1985)
 E.A. Jones Elementary School (Missouri City) (opened 1963)
 Barbara Jordan Elementary School (Unincorporated area) (opened 2002)
 Lakeview Elementary School (Sugar Land) (opened 1962)
 Lantern Lane Elementary School (Missouri City) (opened 1979)
 Donald Leonetti Elementary (Sienna Plantation) (opened 2017)
 Lexington Creek Elementary School (Missouri City) (opened 1994)
 Carolyn and Vernon Madden Elementary (Aliana, Unincorporated area) (opened 2015) 
 Malala Elementary (Aliana, Unincorporated area) (opened 2020)
 Meadows Elementary School (Meadows Place) (opened 1973)
Mission Bend Elementary School (Unincorporated area) (opened 1981)
 Mission Glen Elementary School (Unincorporated area) (opened 1986)
 Mission West Elementary School (Unincorporated area) (opened 1991)
 James C. Neill Elementary School (Unincorporated area) (opened 2017)
 Oakland Elementary School (Unincorporated area) (opened 2006)
 Oyster Creek Elementary School (Unincorporated area) (opened 1999)
 Palmer Elementary School (Missouri City) (opened 1985)
 Rosa Parks Elementary School (Unincorporated area) (opened 2007)
 James Patterson Elementary (Unincorporated area) (opened 2017)
 Pecan Grove Elementary School (Unincorporated area) (opened 1988)
 Quail Valley Elementary School (Missouri City) (opened 1975)
 Ridgegate Elementary School (Houston) (opened 1981)
 Ridgemont Elementary School (Houston) (opened 1973)
 Scanlan Oaks Elementary School (Unincorporated area) (opened 2004)
 Jan Schiff Elementary School (Missouri City) (opened 2008)
 Juan Seguin Elementary School (unincorporated area, Grand Mission) (opened 2009)
 The capacity is 845, and the school is near Richmond. Molina Walker Architects designed the building and Marshall Construction did the building. The cost was $14,500,000. There are about 36 classrooms, with six per grade level. The school relieved Oakland Elementary School and took students from Mission West Elementary who were enrolled in bilingual programs. Seguin was one of the two FBISD campuses most damaged by Hurricane Harvey. James Patterson Elementary and David Crockett Middle temporarily took Seguin students.
 Settlers Way Elementary School (Sugar Land) (opened 1984)
 Sienna Crossing Elementary School (Unincorporated area) (opened 1998)
 Sugar Mill Elementary School (Sugar Land) (opened 1984)
 Anne McCormick Sullivan Elementary (Riverstone, Unincorporated area) (opened 2016) 
Townewest Elementary School (Unincorporated area) (opened 1978)
 Walker Station Elementary School (Unincorporated area) (opened 1992)
Sonal Bhuchar Elementary School (Riverstone) (Planned To Open in Fall 2022)

Other schools 

 Ferndell Henry Alternative Center
 Hosts district's Disciplinary Alternative Education Program (DAEP) 
 Progressive High School
 Classes to help students who are behind in credits/grades
 Technical Education Center
 Hosts CTE classes for all High schools in FBISD
 James Reese Career and Technical Center (opened 2018)
 Newer center to replace aging TEC

Academies
Fort Bend ISD opened several magnet programs to foster small learning communities with a career based focus. Several Academies are housed at different schools and are magnet programs that require an application. The District provides busing throughout the district for Academy students, irrespective of which school they choose to attend, located at their zoned Elementary Campus (or another location deemed appropriate by staff/parents). A few of the Academies were shut down due to low application and attendance rates.

Middle School Academies
 Quail Valley Middle School Academy for the Gifted and Talented (For GT Identified)

High School Academies
 Global Studies Academy (GSA) (Travis HS)*
 International Business and Marketing Academy (IBMA) (Travis HS)*
 Engineering Academy (EA) (Elkins HS)
 Math and Science Academy (MSA) (Dulles HS)
 Medical Science Academy (MSA) (Hightower HS)
 Digital Media Academy (DMA) (Hightower HS)

*The GSA and IBMA academies are under a transition period to Travis HS.
 GSA for '18 are held at Clements HS.
 IBMA for '18 are held at Bush HS.

C.O '19 (+) for both academies are at Travis

Former schools 
 Oaklane Elementary School (Arcola, then unincorporated) (1-8 elementary school for Blacks) (closed 1965)
 Oaklane children were reassigned to Blue Ridge Elementary School, currently in Houston.
 Staffordshire Elementary School (Stafford) (1-4 elementary school) (closed 1965)
 Students were reassigned to E. A. Jones Elementary School in Missouri City
 Annie Wilcox Elementary School (closed 1969)
 M. R. Wood Alternative Education Center (formerly a 1-12 school for black students) 
 Hosts kids who have special needs
 Originally housed DAEP Program for entire district (west side when FHCL opened)

See also 

 Sugar Land, Texas
Fort Bend County, Texas
 Houston, Texas
 Missouri City, Texas
 Meadows Place, Texas
 Pearland, Texas
 Arcola, Texas

Notes

References

External links 

 Fort Bend Independent School District website

 
School districts in Fort Bend County, Texas
School districts in Houston
Missouri City, Texas
Pearland, Texas
Sugar Land, Texas
School districts established in 1959